The 1979 Tipperary Senior Hurling Championship was the 89th staging of the Tipperary Senior Hurling Championship since its establishment by the Tipperary County Board in 1887.

Kilruane MacDonaghs entered the championship as the defending champions.

On 7 October 1979, Kilruane MacDonaghs won the championship after a 2-18 to 3-06 defeat of Thurles Sarsfields in the final at Semple Stadium. It was their third championship title overall and their third title in succession.

Results

Quarter-finals

Semi-finals

Final

Championship statistics

Top scorers

Overall

In a single game

References

Tipperary
Tipperary Senior Hurling Championship